Below is a list of lands set aside as national parks, reserves, or other conservatories by President Theodore Roosevelt via executive order or proclamation.  During his presidency, Roosevelt issued nearly 10 times more executive orders than his predecessor.  Many lands started out as preserves, but were expanded by later presidents and made into national forests.

A cornerstone of his actions focused on the issue of conservation, and Roosevelt set aside more national parks and nature preserves than all of his predecessors combined.  At the time, Roosevelt's executive action was controversial, and many of his actions were brought before a court.

As early as 1892, in his book The Wilderness Hunter, Theodore Roosevelt was calling for the state to take command of wilderness lands.

References

External links
 Executive orders of Theodore Roosevelt
 Presidential Proclamations
 Film and the American Moral Vision of Nature: Theodore Roosevelt to Walt Disney, "Roosevelt was the first president to affirm the intercessory power of the state to regulate nature.  He was the first president to nationalize nature on a large scale and make the state its guardian.", Michigan State University Press
 Transnational Nation: United States History in Global Perspective Since 1789, "The first of these dated from 1872 when Congress acted to preserve Yellowstone.  But it was in the 1890s that moves to create national parks such as Yosemite spread, as part of the quest to sharpen American identity.  This was precisely the moment that a wide reformation of American nationalism began.  This nationalization of the spaces of nature accelerated with the 1906 National Monuments legislation (American Antiquities Act) under President Theodore Roosevelt, and in 1916 the National Park Service was created as a unified system to administer these national parks." Palgrave Macmillan Education Press
 The Nationalization of Nature, by Richard White

Theodore Roosevelt through executive action
Presidency of Theodore Roosevelt